Maria Bertram is a fictional character in Jane Austen's 1814 novel, Mansfield Park.

Character
Maria Bertram is the eldest daughter and third child in a wealthy family that owns the large country estate, Mansfield Park. Her father, Sir Thomas Bertram, is a baronet. She has two older brothers and one sister a year younger than herself. She grows up treated with stern distance by her father, kindly ignored by her indolent, self-centred mother, but spoiled and indulged by her Aunt Norris (who seeks to remain ingratiated with the Bertrams). When she is thirteen, her family brings a poor ten year-old cousin, Fanny Price, to live with them. She has little interest in Fanny and treats her with condescension, giving Fanny the toys of the least value to herself. She mocks Fanny for her ignorance and reports on Fanny's apparent deficiencies to her Aunt Norris. When she grows to adulthood, she is considered in the county to be a great beauty, however, her attitude towards Fanny is little improved.

Maria and Mr. Rushworth
When Sir Thomas goes to Antigua to attend to problems on his plantations, Maria, being at the age to marry, is introduced by Aunt Norris to a young man named Mr. Rushworth. Although Mr. Rushworth is neither intelligent nor handsome, he does have a large estate of 700 acres and is worth about 12,000 pounds per annum, Maria, eager to escape her parental home, agrees to his proposal (subject to Sir Thomas' approval when he returns to England).

Maria and Mr. Crawford
Immediately after Maria's engagement to Mr. Rushworth, a young man named Henry Crawford comes to the neighbourhood with his sister, Mary. Because Maria has no real affection for Mr. Rushworth, she does not scruple to flirt with Henry, and she also befriends Mary. Henry also favours her over her unattached younger sister, Julia, even though (or perhaps because) her engagement  makes her unavailable, Julia, too, is attracted to Crawford. This puts Maria and her sister in competition with one another. When Henry leaves without proposing to her, she insists on going through with her marriage to Mr. Rushworth, partly out of disappointment and partly to escape her stifling home life. She goes to Brighton on her honeymoon, taking Julia with her, and from there the party proceeds to Mr. Rushworth's new London home.

Maria's disgrace
In London, Maria encounters Henry and their flirtation begins anew. It proceeds to an affair, which becomes publicly known. The two elope, bringing shame to her family and disgrace on her. In fear, Julia also elopes and marries Mr. Yates, a friend of her oldest brother, Tom Bertram. Henry, predictably, refuses to marry Maria, and Mr. Rushworth divorces her for adultery. She moves to "another country" (another rural area of England) with her Aunt Norris and they live together financially supported by Sir Thomas.

Notable portrayals
Samantha Bond portrayed the adult Maria in the 1983 British television serial (Mansfield Park (1983 TV serial))
Elizabeth Eaton as the young Maria, and Victoria Hamilton as the teenage Maria in the 1999 film adaptation
Tara Berwin as the younger Maria, and Michelle Ryan in the 2007 BBC television serial, aired on PBS as The Complete Jane Austen

References

Mansfield Park characters
Fictional gentry